Coelogin is a phenanthrenoid found in the high altitude Himalayan orchid Coelogyne cristata. This molecule has a phenanthro[4,5-bcd]pyran structure.

References 

Phenanthrenoids
Coelogyne